{{Infobox radio station
| name             = Heart North West
| logo             = The Heart Network logo.svg
| logo_size        = 200px
| city             = Manchester
| area             = North West England
| branding         = This is Heart
| airdate          = 8 September 1998
| frequency        =  
Cheshire / Greater Manchester / Lancashire / Merseyside: 105.4 MHz 
North Lancashire and South Cumbria: Furness Peninsula: Preston: 96.9 MHz  Windermere, Ambleside, Grasmere: 102.3 MHz
Kendal:  103.2 MHz 
DAB: 10C LiverpoolDAB+: 11B Morecambe Bay
DAB: 12A LancashireDAB: 12C CE Manchester| format           = Hot AC
| power            =
| erp              = 
| class            = 
| callsign_meaning = 
| owner            = Global
| sister_stations  = Capital Manchester and Lancashire,Smooth North West
| website          = Heart North Lancashire & CumbriaHeart North West
| coordinates      =  
}}Heart North West' is a regional radio station owned and operated by Global as part of the Heart network. It broadcasts to North West England from studios in the Spinningfields area of Manchester city centre.

 Overview 

Century Radio (1998–2009)
The station opened as Century Radio on 8 September 1998 as the second Century station in the country (the first being Gateshead-based 100-102 Century Radio). Owned and operated by Border Television, Century was founded by managing director John Myers, who had also established the north east station four years earlier. Like the first station, Myers also presented the breakfast show under the pseudonym John Morgan.

The station's launch was the subject of an episode of a BBC Two fly-on-the-wall documentary Trouble at the Top, mainly following Myers. The episode, entitled "Degsy Rides Again", showed Myers' attempts to train lunchtime phone-in host Derek Hatton, a controversial local ex-politician who had never before presented on radio. Myers was not confident enough in Hatton for him to appear on pre-launch publicity, although his show "The Degsy Debate" performed well at the first RAJAR. Also amongst its launch presenters was controversial shock jock Scottie McClue.

The documentary also covered the station's acquisition of exclusive commentary rights for Manchester United F.C.'s games. They remained United's official radio partner for almost a decade until selling the rights to Xfm Manchester for the 2007–08 season.

Myers left the group to head GMG Radio, overseeing the launch of the similar Real Radio brand. Capital Radio bought the Century network, and was subsequently acquired by GCap Media. GMG Radio acquired the Century stations in October 2006, reuniting Myers and John Simons (programme director on the original Gateshead station) with the brand.

Real Radio (2009–2014)
Century was re-branded as Real Radio on Monday 30 March 2009.

On 15 October 2012, Real Radio announced the station would increase its amount of networked programming. Weekday daytime shows, from 10am to 4pm and presented by Darren Parks and Debbie Mac, were networked across all Real Radio stations on Monday 5 November 2012 with further networked shows introduced at the weekend.

Heart (2014–)
On 25 June 2012 it was announced Global (the owner of stations such as Capital and Heart) had bought GMG Radio. The former GMG stations, including Real Radio, continued to operate separately as 'Real and Smooth Limited' until 1 April 2014.Global Radio seals £50m purchase of GMG Radio Maisie McCabe, Media Week, 25 June 2012

On 6 February 2014, Global announced it would be rebranding all Real Radio stations as Heart. Real Radio North West began a gradual transition to the Heart branding on 24 March 2014 and phased out the Real Radio branding on Sunday 20 April 2014. On 1 May 2014, local programming moved from Laser House in Salford to nearby Exchange Quay, sharing facilities with sister stations Capital Manchester and XFM Manchester. The full relaunch as Heart North West took place at 6am on Tuesday 6 May 2014.

On 12 June 2017, local programming moved from Salford to new studios at the XYZ building in the Spinningfields district of Manchester City Centre. Heart North West shares facilities with its sister station Capital Manchester and Lancashire and two Communicorp-owned stations, Smooth North West and XS Manchester.

Consolidation (2019–)
On 26 February 2019, Global announced sister station Heart North Lancashire & Cumbria would close and merge with Heart North West.

On 3 June 2019, following further deregulation, local breakfast and weekend shows were replaced with network programming from London. Regional output was reduced to a three-hour drivetime show on weekdays, plus localised news bulletins, traffic updates and advertising.

All four of Heart North West's presenters, including breakfast presenters Joel Ross and Lorna Bancroft and weekend presenter Faye Bamford, left the station.

Programming
All networked programming originates from Global's London headquarters, including Heart Breakfast'', presented each weekday by Jamie Theakston and Amanda Holden.

Regional programming is produced and broadcast from Global's Manchester studios from 4-7pm on weekdays, presented by Adam Weighell.

News
Global's Manchester newsroom broadcasts hourly localised news bulletins from 0600–1900 on weekdays and from 0600–1200 at weekends, with headlines on the half hour during breakfast and drivetime shows.

Separate bulletins are produced for the North West of England and the licence area previously served by Heart North Lancashire & Cumbria.

Notable former presenters

 
 Wes Butters 
 Rob Charles
 Rich Clarke 
 Joel Ross

 Lorna Bancroft
 Russ Morris
 Ryan Seacrest
 Graeme Smith  
 Kate Thornton

References

External links
Heart North Lancashire & Cumbria
Heart North West

Mass media in Salford
Radio stations in Lancashire
Radio stations in Manchester
Radio stations established in 1998
North West